Apsidophora is a genus of moths belonging to the subfamily Olethreutinae of the family Tortricidae. It contains only one species, Apsidophora purpurorbis, which is found in Thailand, the Malay Peninsula, Sumatra and New Guinea.

See also
List of Tortricidae genera

References

External links
tortricidae.com

Olethreutini
Monotypic moth genera
Moths of Asia
Moths of Oceania
Moths described in 1973
Tortricidae genera
Taxa named by Alexey Diakonoff